The African Table Tennis Federation (ATTF) is one of the table tennis continental federations recognized by International Table Tennis Federation (ITTF).

References

Table tennis in Africa
Table tennis organizations
Sports organizations of Africa